Arthur Leesch (23 January 1894 – 1955) was a Luxembourgian footballer. He competed in the men's tournament at the 1920 Summer Olympics.

References

1894 births
1955 deaths
Luxembourgian footballers
Luxembourg international footballers
Olympic footballers of Luxembourg
Footballers at the 1920 Summer Olympics
People from Chenoa, Illinois
Association football forwards